Viroqua Municipal Airport,  is a city owned public use airport located 2 miles (3 km) north of the central business district of Viroqua, Wisconsin, a city in Vernon County, Wisconsin, United States. It is included in the Federal Aviation Administration (FAA) National Plan of Integrated Airport Systems for 2021–2025, in which it is categorized as a local general aviation facility.

Although most airports in the United States use the same three-letter location identifier for the FAA and International Air Transport Association (IATA), this airport is assigned Y51 by the FAA but has no designation from the IATA.

Facilities and aircraft 
Viroqua Municipal Airport covers an area of 147 acres (59 ha) at an elevation of 1,292 feet (394 m) above mean sea level. It has two runways: 11/29 is 4,000 by 60 feet (1,219 x 18 m) with an asphalt surface, it has approved GPS approaches and 2/20 is 2,424 by 90 feet (739 x 27 m) with a turf surface.

For the 12-month period ending August 26, 2020, the airport had 9,600 aircraft operations: 99% general aviation, less than 1% air taxi and less than 1% military.
In January 2023, there were 20 aircraft based at this airport: all 20 single-engine.

See also
List of airports in Wisconsin

References

External links 
 Airport page at City of Viroqua website
 

Airports in Wisconsin
Buildings and structures in Vernon County, Wisconsin